Kim Woon-sung (born 22 July 1977) is a South Korean fencer. He competed in the team foil event at the 2004 Summer Olympics.

References

External links
 

1977 births
Living people
South Korean male foil fencers
Olympic fencers of South Korea
Fencers at the 2004 Summer Olympics
Asian Games medalists in fencing
Fencers at the 1998 Asian Games
South Korean foil fencers
Asian Games bronze medalists for South Korea
Medalists at the 1998 Asian Games